Alexandra Fletcher (born 8 July 1976) is an English actress, known for her roles as Jacqui Dixon in Brookside and Diane O'Connor in Hollyoaks.

Career
Fletcher joined Brookside in 1990, and played the role of Jacqui Dixon until the series ended in 2003. In addition to her role in Brookside, she has made a number of other television appearances, both in acting and presenting roles. These include parts in Doctors and MIT: Murder Investigation Team, and a guest presenting role on the chat show Loose Women. 

Fletcher took some time away from acting in the late 2000s and trained as a fitness instructor. She qualified in 2009, and taught at a number of locations. Fletcher joined Hollyoaks in August 2010 as Diane O'Connor. She also appeared as a contestant on the BBC cookery programme Celebrity MasterChef, on 21 July 2010.

Personal life
Fletcher married actor Neil Davies in 2003; Davies previously appeared in Brookside as Robbie Moffatt, an on-screen boyfriend of Fletcher's character. The pair have a son and a daughter together.

Filmography

Awards and nominations

References

External links
 

1976 births
Actresses from Liverpool
English child actresses
English film actresses
English soap opera actresses
English television actresses
Living people
People from Childwall